David Berenbaum is an American screenwriter whose credits include the films Elf (2003), The Haunted Mansion (2003),  Zoom (2006), The Spiderwick Chronicles (2008), and Strange Magic (2015).

Biography
Berenbaum was born in Philadelphia, Pennsylvania and is a graduate of the Tisch School of the Arts.

He was hired to write a sequel to Mrs. Doubtfire, however following Robin Williams' death in 2014 the film was cancelled.

Filmography
Writer
 Elf (2003)
 The Haunted Mansion (2003)
 Zoom (2006)
 The Spiderwick Chronicles (2008)
 Strange Magic (2015)

Actor

As himself

Special thanks
 Dark Arc (2004)

References

External links 

Date of birth missing (living people)
Living people
21st-century American writers
American male screenwriters
Writers from Philadelphia
People from Philadelphia
Tisch School of the Arts alumni
Year of birth missing (living people)